Luigi Albani (born 24 May 1928 in Rome) is an Italian former footballer who played for 5 seasons (50 games) in Serie A for Roma. During his Roma career he was mostly the backup goalkeeper, except for two seasons when he was first-choice: 1951–52, when Roma were in Serie B, and 1952–53.

References

1928 births
Living people
Italian footballers
Serie A players
A.S. Roma players
Association football goalkeepers
20th-century Italian people